Post No Bills is a 1896 French short black-and-white silent comedy film, directed by Georges Méliès, featuring two bill posters squabbling over a poorly guarded wall. The film, one of Méliès' early works, was long thought lost, but was recovered in 2004. It is number 15 on the Star Films catalog Post No Bills is about 74 seconds long.

Synopsis
A sentry marches past a wall, upon which is painted Défense d'afficher (Post No Bills). A bill poster waits for him to pass and pastes up an advertising bill. A second bill poster covers the first ad with a larger poster. The two bill posters squabble, and then flee at the approach of the sentry. The sentry is then reprimanded by his commander for the defacing of the wall.

See also
 List of rediscovered films

References

External links 
 
Défense d'afficher on YouTube

1896 films
French silent short films
French black-and-white films
French short documentary films
Films directed by Georges Méliès
1890s rediscovered films
1890s short documentary films
Rediscovered French films
1890s French films